Sadarame is a 1935 Indian Kannada language mythological drama film directed by Raja Chandrashekar and produced by Gubbi Veeranna, both making their film debuts. This film was the third sound film produced in Kannada cinema. The same film had a Tamil version released as Naveena Sadarame produced by K. Subramanyam and starred S. D. Subbulakshmi in the title role.

Based on a Marathi play "Mitra"  by Shirish Athwale, Veeranna had adapted it in his theater play and finally brought it onto the big screen in 1935. He produced the film under the banner Shakuntala Films.

The film cast consisted of Veeranna himself in the role of a thief named "Pucca Kalla" and K. Ashwathamma, a singing actress, made her first onscreen appearance in the film. The music was composed by Venkataramaiah.

Plot
The film revolves around Sadarame, a brave woman who dares all the challenges she faces in life and a prince who admires her for her bravery and falls in love with her. She dons a male outfit to escape from a thief with a roving eyes, called Pucca Kalla. Thinking her to be a male, a princess falls in love with her and a confusion over the characters follows. The films ends up with the prince marrying both Sadarame and the princess.

Cast
 Gubbi Veeranna as Pucca Kalla
 K. Ashwathamma as Sadarame
 CID Shakuntala
 Swarnamma
 B. Jayamma
 Murarachaar

See also
 List of Kannada films of the 1930s

References

External sources

1935 films
1930s Kannada-language films
Indian biographical drama films
Indian black-and-white films
Films scored by Venkataramaiah
Indian films based on plays
Indian multilingual films
Kannada films remade in other languages
Cross-dressing in Indian films
1930s biographical drama films
1935 directorial debut films
1935 drama films